William Martin Morris (born 8 October 1943) served as the bishop of the Roman Catholic Diocese of Toowoomba in Australia from 1992 to 2011. In May 2011, the Holy See removed Morris from pastoral care of the diocese, attracting international press coverage.

Pastoral career
Morris was born in Brisbane, where he was educated at St Joseph's College, Gregory Terrace, before studying for the priesthood at Pius XII Provincial Seminary in Banyo. He was ordained a priest of the Archdiocese of Brisbane in 1969. His parish appointments included Sunnybank, Nambour, Mt Gravatt, Goodna and Surfers Paradise. During 1979 to 1984 he served as secretary to Archbishop Francis Rush in Brisbane and also as Diocesan Director of Vocations.

In 1992, Morris was appointed by Pope John Paul II to head the Toowoomba diocese. His consecration took place at St Patrick's Cathedral on 10 February 1993. He became known for his pastoral leadership and his work with diocesan cases of sexual abuse. In 2009 he dismissed the principal of a Toowoomba Catholic primary school and two Catholic Education officials for failing to report to the police an early complaint from a schoolgirl.

There were reports of liturgical unorthodoxy and controversy about his support of the Third Rite of Confession.

In 2006 Morris released a pastoral letter that discussed the declining number of priests in remote dioceses like Toowoomba. The letter called for discussion of the ordination of married men and the ordination of women. To call for such a discussion could be interpreted as a challenge to the teaching of Pope John Paul II's apostolic letter Ordinatio Sacerdotalis, which said that "the Church has no authority whatsoever to confer priestly ordination on women." The letter also suggested that the Catholic Church might consider recognising "Anglican, Lutheran, and Uniting Church orders".

In December 2006, Morris received a fax requesting that he come to Rome by February 2007 for meetings with three cardinals; Giovanni Battista Re, then head of the Vatican's Congregation for Bishops, William Levada, then head of the Congregation for the Doctrine of the Faith and Francis Arinze. Morris did not attend, citing "pastoral reasons", and offered to present himself in May.

An apostolic visitation of the diocese was conducted by Charles J. Chaput OFM Cap, Archbishop of Denver during April 2007. Chaput reported to the Congregation for Bishops in May 2007. Morris says that he has never seen this report. He was given an unsigned document from the Congregation for Bishops indicating 13 separate issues.

Morris then negotiated with several Vatican congregations for several years. Attempts by Vatican administrators to reconcile Morris with the church's position included several meetings in Rome where, it has been reported, he was asked to resign several times.

In December 2008, Morris wrote to Pope Benedict XVI requesting an audience. He was received by the Pope on 4 June 2009. Later Morris claimed that he was told that "it is God’s will that you resign".

In February 2011 the Apostolic Nuncio to Australia, Giuseppe Lazzarotto, wrote to Morris requesting his resignation.

Removal as diocesan bishop
On 1 May 2011, Morris stated in a letter to parishioners of his diocese that "it has been determined by Pope Benedict XVI that the diocese would be better served by the leadership of a new bishop", but that he felt that he was being denied "natural justice". Morris announced his early retirement at age 67, stressing the fact that he had not resigned. On 2 May, the Apostolic Nuncio to Australia announced that the Pope had "removed [Morris] from pastoral care" of his diocese. Morris became Bishop Emeritus of Toowoomba.

Several hundred people attended two separate vigils for Morris on 3 May in Toowoomba.

On 13 May 2011, the Australian Catholic Bishops' Conference (ACBC) issued a statement, stating that they supported Pope Benedict's decision to remove Morris. In the statement they noted:

"it was judged that there were problems of doctrine and discipline, and we regret that these could not be resolved. We are hopeful that Bishop Morris will continue to serve the Church in other ways in the years ahead".

At a meeting of the Permanent Committee of the ACBC on 2 August 2011, a petition was presented from many Catholics of the Diocese of Toowoomba in support of Morris. In a statement on 11 August the Permanent Committee said that 
"the reality of our ecclesial structure is that the Conference is not able to resolve the issues that have arisen. Not only do the local Bishops not have access to all the information on which Pope Benedict came to his decision, but what has happened in Toowoomba is a matter between the Holy Father and Bishop Morris."

During an Ad Limina visit in Rome that month, ACBC bishops held discussions regarding the situation in Toowoomba with both Cardinal Marc Ouellet and Cardinal William Levada and among themselves. Archbishop Mark Coleridge said that the talks "went very positively" and "surpassed" their expectations. In a letter from the ACBC, released on 21 October:
"What was at stake was the Church’s unity in faith and the ecclesial communion between the Pope and the other Bishops in the College of Bishops ... we express our acceptance of the Holy Father’s exercise of his Petrine ministry ... (and) we return to Australia determined to do whatever we can to heal any wounds of division."

Morris responded to the letter on 24 October 2011, writing:
"The statement of the Australian Catholic Bishops contains inaccuracies and errors of fact evidenced by the documentation relating to the issues concerning myself and a number of Vatican Dicasteries.  The Statement made by the Australian Bishops invites me to tell my story which I will publish in the foreseeable future."

In October 2011, it was reported that several lay Catholics in Toowoomba had expressed concern that Morris still had a high profile in the diocese, giving a public lecture, in-service talks to teachers and officiating at parish anniversaries. Cardinal George Pell said to CNA "if he is a loyal man of the Church he'll realize that this is totally inappropriate and that won't continue. That is my hope."

Morris gave an address for Women and the Australian Church on 26 March 2013. He spoke about the vital role of lay people in interpreting the Second Vatican Council and "reclaiming its spirit".

In June 2014 his book Benedict, Me and the Cardinals Three was published, describing his experience of the dismissal.

References

Further reading 

1943 births
Living people
People from Brisbane
Roman Catholic bishops of Toowoomba